Timothy McRae (born August 4, 1970) is a former Olympic weightlifter for the United States.  His coach was Dragomir Cioroslan. He currently coaches Weightlifting at New Smyrna Beach High School.

Weightlifting achievements
Olympic Team member (1992 and 1996)
Senior American record holder in snatch, clean and jerk, and total (1993–1997)
On April 24, 2010, he coached the New Smyrna Beach Barracudas Boys Weightlifting team to their first state title in school history.  They are the only team in the school to win a state title.  Since, New Smyrna Beach Boys Weightlifting have won two more titles (2014, 2015).

External links
Tim McRae - Hall of Fame at Weightlifting Exchange

1970 births
Living people
American male weightlifters
Olympic weightlifters of the United States
Weightlifters at the 1992 Summer Olympics
Weightlifters at the 1996 Summer Olympics
Weightlifters at the 1995 Pan American Games
Weightlifters at the 1999 Pan American Games
Pan American Games bronze medalists for the United States
Pan American Games medalists in weightlifting
Medalists at the 1995 Pan American Games
20th-century American people
21st-century American people